The Ambassador of Russia to Tunisia is the official representative of the President and the Government of the Russian Federation to the President and the Government of Tunisia.

The ambassador and his staff work at large in the Russian embassy in Tunis.

History of diplomatic relations

Diplomatic relations between the USSR and Tunisia were established on 11 July 1956. The embassy in Tunis was opened on 4 May 1960, with the first ambassador, appointed on 30 August 1960 and presenting his credentials on 7 September 1960. After the dissolution of the Soviet Union, Tunisia announced the recognition of Russia as its legal successor on 25 December 1991. The incumbent Soviet ambassador, continued as a representative of the Russian Federation until 1996.

List of representatives (1960- present)

Representatives of the Soviet Union to Tunisia (1960-1991)

Representatives of the Russian Federation to Tunisia (1991-present)

References 

 
Tunisia
Russia